This is a list of Democratic National Conventions. These conventions are the presidential nominating conventions of the Democratic Party of the United States.

List of Democratic National Conventions
 Conventions whose nominees won the subsequent presidential election are tinted in light blue.
 Four other conventions — in 1876, 1888, 2000, and 2016 — which nominated candidates who won the popular vote, but not the Electoral College, are tinted in pale yellow.

Footnotes

1[1832] A resolution endorsing "the repeated nominations which he [Jackson] has received in various parts of the Union" was passed by the convention.

2[1840] A resolution stating "that the convention deem it expedient at the present time not to choose between the individuals in nomination, but to leave the decision to their Republican fellow-citizens in the several states" was passed by the convention. Most Van Buren electors voted for Richard Mentor Johnson of Kentucky for the vice presidency; others voted for Littleton Waller Tazewell of Virginia and James K. Polk of Tennessee in the election of 1840.

3[1844] Silas Wright of New York was first nominated and he declined the nomination.

4[1860 June] Caleb Cushing resigned as permanent chair.

5[1860 June] Douglas and Johnson were chosen as the candidates of the Front Street Theater convention after most of the Southern delegations walked out. The convention bolters soon formed their own convention, located at the Maryland Institute, also in Baltimore, on June 28, 1860. At their convention Caleb Cushing again served as permanent chair and John C. Breckinridge of Kentucky was nominated for the presidency and Joseph Lane of Oregon was nominated for the vice presidency. (1860 Southern Democratic platform)

6[1860 June] Benjamin Fitzpatrick of Alabama was first nominated but he declined the nomination.

7[1872] Greeley and B. Gratz Brown had already been endorsed by the Liberal Republican Party, meeting on May 1 in Cincinnati. A dissident group of Straight-Out Democrats, meeting in Louisville, Kentucky on September 3, nominated Charles O'Conor of New York for President and John Quincy Adams II of Massachusetts for Vice President, but both men declined the nomination.
8[1896] "Gold" Democrats opposed to the Free Silver plank of the 1896 platform and to Wm J. Bryan's candidacy convened as the National Democratic Party in Indianapolis on September 2, and nominated John M. Palmer of Illinois for President and former Governor Simon Bolivar Buckner of Kentucky for Vice President.
9[1896] Bryan was later nominated for President in St. Louis, together with Thomas E. Watson of Georgia for Vice President, by the National Silver Republican Party meeting on July 22, and by the People's Party (Populists) meeting on July 25.
10 [1948] Breakaway delegations left the Philadelphia Convention for conventions of the Progressive and States Rights Democratic Parties. The Progressives, meeting on July 23, also in Philadelphia, nominated former Vice President Henry A. Wallace of Iowa for President and Senator Glen H. Taylor of Idaho for Vice President. (1948 Progressive Party platform)The States' Rights Democrats (or "Dixiecrats"), meeting in Birmingham, Alabama on July 17, nominated Governors Strom Thurmond of South Carolina for President and Fielding Wright of Mississippi for Vice President. (1948 States' Rights Democratic platform)

11[1972] Eagleton withdrew his candidacy after the convention and was replaced by Sargent Shriver of Maryland.

12[2016] Debbie Wasserman Schultz of Florida was intended to be the Temporary Chair, but was substituted for Stephanie Rawliings-Blake by the Democratic National Committee in the wake of the Wasserman/DNC email leak scandal. Wasserman resigned as Chairman of the Democratic National Committee effective after the close of the convention.

13[2020] Originally scheduled for July 13–16, and originally planned for the Fiserv Forum, but postponed and moved due to the COVID-19 pandemic.

14[2020] Centered in Milwaukee, but many speeches and roll call responses were given remotely due to the COVID-19 pandemic.

Keynote speakers
 1896 – U.S. Senator John W. Daniel of Virginia
 1900 – Governor Charles S. Thomas of Colorado
 1904 – U.S. Representative John Sharp Williams of Mississippi
 1908 – U.S. Representative Theodore Bell of California
 1912 – Chief Judge Alton B. Parker of New York
 1916 – Governor Martin Glynn of New York
 1920 – DNC Chair Homer Cummings of Connecticut
 1924 – U.S. Senator Pat Harrison of Mississippi
 1928 – Claude Bowers of New York
 1932 – U.S. Senator Alben Barkley of Kentucky
 1936 – U.S. Senator Alben Barkley of Kentucky and U.S. Senator Joseph Robinson of Arkansas
 1940 – U.S. Representative William Bankhead of Alabama
 1944 – Governor Robert Kerr of Oklahoma
 1948 – U.S. Senator Alben Barkley of Kentucky
 1952 – Governor Paul Dever of Massachusetts
 1956 – Governor Frank Clement of Tennessee
 1960 – U.S. Senator Frank Church of Idaho
 1964 – U.S. Senator John O. Pastore of Rhode Island
 1968 – U.S. Senator Daniel Inouye of Hawaii
 1972 – Governor Reubin Askew of Florida
 1976 – U.S. Representative Barbara Jordan of Texas and U.S. Senator John Glenn of Ohio
 1980 – U.S. Representative Mo Udall of Arizona
 1984 – Governor Mario Cuomo of New York
 1988 – State Treasurer Ann Richards of Texas
 1992 – U.S. Senator Bill Bradley of New Jersey, U.S. Representative Barbara Jordan of Texas, and Governor Zell Miller of Georgia
 1996 – Governor Evan Bayh of Indiana
 2000 – U.S. Representative Harold Ford Jr. of Tennessee
 2004 – State Senator Barack Obama of Illinois
 2008 – Governor Mark Warner of Virginia
 2012 – Mayor Julián Castro of Texas
 2016 – U.S. Senator Elizabeth Warren of Massachusetts
 2020 – 17 speakers

Gallery of convention sites

See also
 List of United States Democratic Party presidential tickets
 List of presidential nominating conventions in the United States
 List of Republican National Conventions
 List of Whig National Conventions
 U.S. presidential election
 U.S. presidential primary
 2016 Democratic National Convention
 2020 Democratic National Convention

References

Democratic Party (United States)-related lists